Invorio is a comune (municipality) in the Province of Novara in the Italian region of Piedmont, located about  northeast of Turin and about  northwest of Novara.  
Invorio borders the following municipalities: Ameno, Arona, Bolzano Novarese, Borgomanero, Briga Novarese, Colazza, Gattico-Veruno, Gozzano, Meina, and Paruzzaro.

References

Cities and towns in Piedmont